B. alba may refer to:

 Baptisia alba, the white wild indigo or white false indigo, a herbaceous plant species native from central and eastern North America
 Basella alba, the Malabar spinach, a perennial vine species found in the tropics
 Bidens alba,  an Asteraceae plant species.
 Bryonia alba, the white bryony, a vigorous Eurasian vine species introduced into Western North America

See also
 Alba (disambiguation)